The Parliamentary Private Secretary to the Cabinet Office is a Parliamentary Private Secretary that supports the Cabinet Office. The current officeholder is Peter Gibson MP.

List of officeholders 

 Roberta Blackman-Woods (2006 to 2007)
 David Burrowes (2010 to 2012)
 Alan Campbell (2001 to 2003)
 Jeffrey Ennis (2007 to 2010)
 Nigel Evans (1994 to 1995)
 Derek Foster (1997 - in role for two days)
 Edward Garnier (1997)
 Mary Hamilton (1929 to 1931)
 Kevin Hollinrake
 Jane Hunt (2020 to 2022)
 Barbara Keeley (8 February 2006 to June 2006)
 Ian Levy (2022)
 Pat McFadden
 Gillian Merron (June 2007 to January 2008)
 Damien Moore
 Margaret Moran
 James Morris
 David Mowat (2014 to 2015)
 Ian Pearson (1997 to 1998)
 Will Quince
 Lawrie Quinn
 Angela Smith
 Mark Tami
 Tom Watson
 Angie Bray
 Kevin Foster

References 

Cabinet Office (United Kingdom)
Ministerial positions in the Government of the United Kingdom